Lucky Agbonsevbafe (born 12 August 1969) is a former Nigerian footballer. He was a member of the Nigerian team that won the 1st edition of the 1985 Kodak/FIFA U-16 World Championship in China. He was part of the Nigerian U-20 team at the 1987 FIFA World Youth Championship in Chile and also was part of Nigeria's soccer team at the 1988 Summer Olympics in Seoul.

Agbonsevbafe is a Latter-day Saint and was the first Latter-day Saint to represent Nigeria at the Olympics.

References
black LDS athletes page
2009 Deseret Morning News Church Almanac (Salt Lake City, Utah: Deseret Morning News, 2008) p. 327

1969 births
Nigerian Latter Day Saints
Living people
Nigerian footballers
Nigeria under-20 international footballers
Nigeria youth international footballers
Olympic footballers of Nigeria
Footballers at the 1988 Summer Olympics

Association footballers not categorized by position